Barry Diamond (born November 14, 1951) is an American comedian who released one album, Fighter Pilot, on IRS Records in 1983.  He continues to perform stand-up comedy today.

He has had bit parts in several films and television sitcoms. He played a comedian in an episode of Seinfeld - "The Movie", a part in Friends season 2 episode 7 “The One Where Ross Finds Out”, and a major role in 1984's Bachelor Party, which starred Tom Hanks.  As a stand-up comedian he was a regular on ABC's The 1/2 Hour Comedy Hour c. 1983.

Fighter Pilot
Fighter Pilot was released on IRS Records in June 1983 after Diamond was discovered by IRS's Miles Copeland III.  It was released on vinyl LP (SP-70035) and cassette tape only, and has never been released on CD.

Track listing
What Pisses Me Off
How I Got Started In Showbiz
The South Bronx
Gay Whale Hunting In Hawaii
Live And Let Live
Killed My Girlfriend
Everything Except The...
Nuclear Missile Silo Repairman
Tribute To The Boss
Health, Money, Herpes
College In Peru
Fighter Pilot
My House After The Show

References

External links

Barry Diamond page on IRS Corner
Official Website

American stand-up comedians
Living people
Comedians from New York City
1951 births